The 26th Legislative Assembly of British Columbia sat from 1961 to 1963. The members were elected in the British Columbia general election held in September 1960. The Social Credit Party led by W. A. C. Bennett formed the government. The Co-operative Commonwealth Federation (CCF) led by Robert Strachan formed the official opposition.

Lorne Shantz served as speaker for the assembly.

Members of the 26th General Assembly 
The following members were elected to the assembly in 1960:

Notes:

Party standings

By-elections 
By-elections were held to replace members for various reasons:

Notes:

References 

Political history of British Columbia
Terms of British Columbia Parliaments
1961 establishments in British Columbia
1963 disestablishments in British Columbia
20th century in British Columbia